Marhi Da Deeva is a 1989 Indian Punjabi-language film directed by Surinder Singh, starring Raj Babbar, Deepti Naval and Parikshit Sahni in the lead roles. It was a critically acclaimed and well-received film based on a novel of the same name by Gurdial Singh. It won the National Award for Best Feature Film in Punjabi.

Music 

Mahinderjit Singh composed the music with playback singers Jaspal Singh and Prabhsharan Kaur Sidhu. Lyrics were penned by Naqsh Lyallpuri.

Cast

References

External links 

1989 films
Punjabi-language Indian films
1980s Punjabi-language films
Films based on Indian novels
Best Punjabi Feature Film National Film Award winners